Canning is a method of preserving food in which the food contents are processed and sealed in an airtight container.

Canning may also refer to:

People
 Alfred Canning (1860–1936), Australian surveyor
 Andrea Canning (born 1972), North American TV news reporter
 Brendan Canning (born 1969), Canadian musician
 Charles Canning, 1st Earl Canning (1812–1862), British statesman and Governor-General of India
 Charlotte Canning, Countess Canning (1817–1861), wife of Charles Canning
 Curtis Canning (born 1946), American rower at the 1968 Summer Olympics
 Danny Canning (1926–2014), Welsh footballer
 Effie Canning (1857–1940), American actress, composer of "Rock-a-bye Baby"
 Elizabeth Canning (1734–1773), Englishwoman transported for perjury
 George Canning (1770–1827), British politician and Prime Minister (April–August 1827)
 Griffin Canning (born 1996), American professional baseball pitcher
 Joan Canning, 1st Viscountess Canning (1776–1837), wife of George Canning
Joseph A. Canning (1882–1951), American Jesuit missionary and educator
 Lisa Canning (born 1966), U.S. television presenter
 M. F. A. Canning (born Marinus Francis Alfred Canning, generally known as Alfred Canning; 1829-1911), Australian politician
 Mark Canning (diplomat) (born 1954), British Ambassador to Indonesia 2011–present
 Sara Canning (born 1987), Canadian actress
 Stratford Canning, 1st Viscount Stratford de Redcliffe (1786–1880), British ambassador to the Ottoman Empire
 Thomas Canning (1911–1989), American composer
 Victor Canning (1911–1986), British novelist

Places

Argentina
 Canning, Buenos Aires, a district of Esteban Echeverría Partido, in Argentina
 Canning Avenue, the former name of Raúl Scalabrini Ortiz avenue, a road in Buenos Aires
 Canning Station, the former name of Scalabrini Ortiz (Buenos Aires Underground)

Australia
 Canning Basin, a geological basin in Western Australia
 Canning Bridge, a crossing of Canning River, Western Australia
 Canning Highway, a major arterial road in Perth, Western Australia
 Canning River (Western Australia), flowing through Perth
 Canning Stock Route, a track from Halls Creek to Wiluna in Western Australia
 Canning Vale, Western Australia, a suburb of Perth
 City of Canning, a local government area in Western Australia based in Cannington
 Division of Canning, an Australian federal electoral division in southern Perth

England
 Canning, Liverpool
 Canning Dock, on the River Mersey and part of the Port of Liverpool
 Canning Town, part of east London
 Canning Town station, a transport interchange in Canning Town

India
 Canning, South 24 Parganas, a town  in South 24 Parganas district in the state of West Bengal
 Canning I, Community development block in West Bengal, India
 Canning II, Community development block in West Bengal, India
 Canning subdivision, an administrative subdivision of South 24 Paraganas district in the state of West Bengal

United States
 Canning, South Dakota, an unincorporated community
 Canning Creek, a river in Kansas
 Canning River (Alaska), United States

Canada
 Canning Parish, New Brunswick, in Queens County
 Canning, Nova Scotia, a village in Canada

Other
 Canning (state constituency), Malaysia

See also
 Fort Canning Hill, a hill in Singapore
 Cannery